Ressiana may refer to 
 Rhesaina, a late Roman city in Mesopotamia Secunda
 Ressiana (North Africa), a late Roman City in North Africa

See also 
Resana
Ressia